Adam Lindemann is an American investor, writer, art collector, and art dealer. In 2012, he founded the gallery Venus Over Manhattan in New York City.

Career
Earlier in his career, Lindemann served as SVP on the arbitrage desk at Oppenheimer & Co. before starting his own investment firm, Lindemann Capital Partners. He purchased a Spanish-language radio company Mega Broadcasting from Alfredo Alonso renaming it Mega Communications, which operated 21 stations and sold in 2007.

As an art collector and gallerist, Lindemann is known for setting multiple world records both at auction and privately, including career records for Jeff Koons, Takashi Murakami, and Jean-Michel Basquiat. His personal collection has included pieces by blue chip artists including Richard Prince, Maurizio Cattelan, Damien Hirst, Jeff Koons, Andy Warhol, and Urs Fischer. He famously sold a 1982 canvas by Basquiat at Christie’s for $57.3 million in 2016, a high for the artist at auction at that time (Lindemann had bought the painting for $4.5 million in 2004). In 2007, he sold Koons’s “Hanging Heart (Magenta/Gold)” at Sotheby’s for $23.5 million (he had bought it for about $1.2 million in 2003).

Lindemann has written extensively on art, including the best-selling book Collecting Contemporary Art (2006) for the publishing house Taschen, as well as a popular art world column for The New York Observer for four years.

In 2021, Lindeman and Amalia Dayan established South Etna, a nonprofit organization that brings contemporary artists to Montauk and presents exhibitions.

Venus Over Manhattan
In 2012, Lindemann founded the New York-based gallery Venus Over Manhattan as a platform for exhibitions and projects that expand upon the conventional gallery format. The gallery is dedicated to curated exhibitions both historic and contemporary, which seek to cast a unique and often iconoclastic light on the work of established and overlooked artists.

Noteworthy exhibitions have included solo presentations of work by Billy Al Bengston, Bernard Buffet, Alexander Calder, Maurizio Cattelan, William N. Copley, Walter Dahn, Jack Goldstein, Michel Houellebecq, Mike Kelley, John McCraken, Raymond Pettibon, Peter Saul, Andy Warhol, H.C. Westermann, and Roy De Forest. Venus Over Manhattan has also collaborated with prominent foundations, estates, and galleries including the Calder Foundation, the estate of Chicago gallerist Allan Frumkin, the estate of William N. Copley, Sprüth Magers, David Zwirner Gallery, and White Columns.

In early March 2020, Venus Over Manhattan became one of the first galleries to close its space when the COVID-19 outbreak started to take hold of New York. Subsequently, the gallery was forced to shutter an exhibition of significant works by the late artist Roy de Forest and adopted a virtual display model. Despite restrictions preventing in-person viewership, New York Times critic Roberta Smith reviewed the current show of Roy De Forest's work favorably, saying it “booms forth” from the gallery's website.

In 2019, Venus Over Manhattan began representing a roster of artists and estates including Peter Saul, the estate of Roger Brown, and the estate of Roy de Forest.

Personal life
Lindemann was raised in New York City and is the son of late businessman George Lindemann and Dr. Frayda B. Lindemann. He graduated from the Lycée Français De New York with a French Baccalaureate, magna cum laude from Amherst College in Spanish and comparative literature, and Yale Law School.

Lindemann has been married to art dealer Amalia Dayan, the granddaughter of Moshe Dayan since 2006. Together, they have two daughters. Lindemann has three daughters from a previous marriage.

In 2004, Lindemann and Dayan commissioned architect David Adjaye with renovating a  cottage in Montauk; they sold the property for $12.5 million in 2021. The couple owns Eothen, Andy Warhol’s former Montauk estate.

References 

Year of birth missing (living people)
Living people
Amherst College alumni
Yale Law School alumni
Lycée Français de New York alumni